Ilija Gojković (Serbian Cyrillic: Илија Гојковић; 2 August 1854 – 15 February 1917) was a Serbian military commander and Minister of Defence. He became well-known for commanding the Serbs in the east around Timok.

He served during the Serbian–Turkish Wars, the Balkan Wars and during the Serbian Campaign (part of the larger Balkans Campaign) during World War I.

Career
Gojković was the Minister of Defence of the Kingdom of Serbia from 4 March 1910 to 24 February 1911.

Death
While traveling to the Salonica front, his boat was hit by a German torpedo boat near Sicily. Gojković refused to surrender and was killed while shooting back at the torpedo boat. He drowned in the Ionian Sea.

Gojković was the highest ranking member of the Serbian Army that died in combat during the First World War.

See also
 Petar Bojović
 Radomir Putnik
 Živojin Mišić
 Stepa Stepanović
 Božidar Janković
 Pavle Jurišić Šturm
 Ivan S. Pavlović

References

External links
 Čovek koji je pucao na nemačku podmornicu 

1854 births
1917 deaths
People from Paraćin
19th-century Serbian people
20th-century Serbian people
Serbian soldiers
Serbian generals
Royal Serbian Army soldiers
Government ministers of Serbia
Serbian military personnel of the Balkan Wars
Serbian military personnel of World War I
Serbian military personnel killed in World War I
People who died at sea
Burials at sea
Defence ministers of Serbia